The 2013–14 Trabzonspor season was the club's 39th consecutive season in the Süper Lig.

Squad

Out on loan

Transfers

Summer

In:

 

Out:

Winter

In:

Out:

Competitions

Süper Lig

Results

League table

Turkish Cup

First stage

UEFA Europa League

Qualifying rounds

Group stage

Knockout phase

Squad statistics

Appearances and goals

|-
|colspan="14"|Players away from the club on loan :

|-
|colspan="14"|Players who appeared for Trabzonspor no longer at the club:

|}

Goal scorers

Disciplinary Record

References

2013-14
Turkish football clubs 2013–14 season
2013–14 UEFA Europa League participants seasons